The 12413 / 12414 Pooja Superfast Express is a daily train departing from  in Rajasthan to  in Jammu and Kashmir in North India. This train leaves Ajmer at 14:05 IST and reaches next day at Jammu Tawi at 8:20 IST in the morning covering a distance of 1018 km. It crosses a total of 21 railway stations, stopping anywhere from 2 to 30 mins, depending on the passenger movement.

Schedule & route

Traction
The train is hauled by a Ghaziabad Electric Loco Shed-based WAP-7 locomotive for its entire journey.

References

Transport in Ajmer
Transport in Jammu
Express trains in India
Rail transport in Jammu and Kashmir
Rail transport in Rajasthan
Rail transport in Haryana
Rail transport in Punjab, India
Named passenger trains of India